John Davie (19 February 1913 – June 1994) was a Scottish professional footballer who played in the Football League for Brighton & Hove Albion and Barnsley as a centre forward.

Personal life 
Davie enlisted in the Police Reserve Force during the Second World War and later served in the British Army as a PT sergeant.

Honours 
Margate

 Southern League Eastern Division: 1935–36
 Southern League Central Division: 1935–36
 Kent Senior Cup: 1935–36
 Kent Senior Shield: 1935–36

Career statistics

References

Scottish footballers
1913 births
1994 deaths
Military personnel from Fife
Footballers from Dunfermline
Margate F.C. players
Arsenal F.C. players
Hibernian F.C. players
St Johnstone F.C. players
Brighton & Hove Albion F.C. players
Barnsley F.C. players
Kidderminster Harriers F.C. players
Brentford F.C. wartime guest players
Association football forwards
English Football League players
Scottish Football League players
Southern Football League players
St Bernard's F.C. wartime guest players
Stockton F.C. players
Shrewsbury Town F.C. players
Leeds United F.C. wartime guest players
Clapton Orient F.C. wartime guest players
Reading F.C. wartime guest players
Queens Park Rangers F.C. wartime guest players
Crystal Palace F.C. wartime guest players
Fulham F.C. wartime guest players
Millwall F.C. wartime guest players
Southampton F.C. wartime guest players
Aldershot F.C. wartime guest players
Charlton Athletic F.C. players
Chesterfield F.C. wartime guest players
Mansfield Town F.C. wartime guest players
Nottingham Forest F.C. wartime guest players
Notts County F.C. wartime guest players
Sunderland A.F.C. wartime guest players
Manchester United F.C. wartime guest players
British Army personnel of World War II
St Bernard's F.C. players
Dunfermline Athletic F.C. players
Royal Army Physical Training Corps soldiers